Louis Marie Joseph Le Beschu de Champsavin (24 November 1867 – 20 December 1916) was a French military officer and horse rider.

Personal life
Champsavin was born in Assérac on 24 November 1867. In 1894, he married Amelie Clemence.

Champsavin was appointed a Chevalier of the Légion d'honneur and Chevalier of the Order of Agricultural Merit.

Military career
Champsavin began his military education at École spéciale militaire de Saint-Cyr in 1887. From there he went to École de cavalerie, Saumur. On graduating he joined the 24th Dragoon Regiment in 1891 as sub-lieutenant. He was promoted to lieutenant in 1892.

Between 1899 and 1903, he was a riding instructor at Saint-Cyr. He was promoted to captain in 1903, and chef d'escadron in 1913.

During World War I Champsavin led the 20th Cavalry Regiment and came to command Fort Tavannes during the Battle of Verdun. The many gas shells that fell on the fort during this time caused his health to deteriorate, and he died in hospital in Nantes on 20 December 1916. He was awarded the Croix de Guerre.

Equestrian
Champsavin competed in the 1900 Olympic Games, held in Paris. Aboard his horse, Terpsichore, he won the bronze medal in the jumping event, and was not placed in the hacks and hunter event.

See also
List of Olympians killed in World War I

References

External links

1867 births
1916 deaths
Sportspeople from Loire-Atlantique
French male equestrians
Olympic bronze medalists for France
Olympic equestrians of France
Equestrians at the 1900 Summer Olympics
Olympic medalists in equestrian
French military personnel killed in World War I
Medalists at the 1900 Summer Olympics
École Spéciale Militaire de Saint-Cyr alumni
French Army officers
Recipients of the Croix de Guerre 1914–1918 (France)
Chevaliers of the Légion d'honneur
Knights of the Order of Agricultural Merit